Edvin Crona (born 25 January 2000) is a Swedish footballer who plays as a forward for Åtvidaberg on loan from Kalmar FF in Allsvenskan.

Club career
On 29 March 2022, Crona joined Åtvidaberg on loan.

References

2000 births
Living people
Association football forwards
Swedish footballers
Sweden youth international footballers
Sweden under-21 international footballers
Kalmar FF players
IFK Värnamo players
Oskarshamns AIK players
Åtvidabergs FF players
Allsvenskan players
Ettan Fotboll players